Drakensberg minnow is a common name for several fishes and may refer to:

 Labeobarbus aspius, endemic to the Congo Democratic Republic
 Pseudobarbus quathlambae, endemic to Lesotho